Lagrange point colonization is a proposed form of space colonization of the five equilibrium points in the orbit of a planet or its primary moon, called Lagrange points.

Thus, the points L4 and L5 in the Earth–Moon system have been proposed as possible sites for space colonies. The L5 Society was founded to promote settlement by building space stations at these points.

Gerard K. O'Neill suggested in 1974 that the Earth–Moon L5 point, in particular, could fit several thousands of floating colonies, and would allow easy travel to and from the colonies due to the shallow effective potential at this point. A contemporary NASA team estimated that a 500,000-tonne colony would cost US$5.1 billion (equivalent to US$ billion in ) to build.

O'Neill proposed manufacturing large cylinders or spheres as colony habitats, while others proposed an enclosed torus shape or a huge ring without a "roof".  Another approach is to move an asteroid to a lagrange point with a colony in its hollow interior.

See also 
Interplanetary Transport Network
Lissajous orbit

References

External links 

Dictionary Definition
European Space Agency
Free Mars
Orbital Vector
NASA - The Moon and the Magnetotail

Space colonization